Gleditsia amorphoides is a tree in the family Fabaceae. It is native to South America.

References 

amorphoides